Owsaluy-e Allahverdi Khan (also Romanized as Owşālūy-e Allāhverdī Khān; also known as Owşālū-ye Allāhverdī Khān and Ūşālū-ye Allāhverdī) is a village in Tala Tappeh Rural District, Nazlu District, Urmia County, West Azerbaijan Province, Iran. At the 2006 census, its population was 284, in 87 families.

References 

Populated places in Urmia County